Charles C. P. Baldwin (December 28, 1812- October 28, 1893) was a government official in Vermont.  A Republican, prior to becoming a resident of Iowa in his later years, he served as Sheriff of Orange County, Vermont and United States Marshal for the District of Vermont.

Biography
Charles C. P. Baldwin was born in Bradford, Vermont on December 28, 1812, a son of Benjamin Peters Baldwin (1767-1857) and Mehitable (Gordon) Baldwin (1774-1857).  Baldwin was named for Charles Cotesworth Pinckney, and his name was often abbreviated as C. C. P. Baldwin or Chas. C. P. Baldwin.  He was raised and educated in Bradford and became a farmer.  Baldwin was also active in Bradford-area businesses, to include serving on the board of directors of the Vermont Copper Mining Company.  Baldwin was also active in the Vermont Militia; when a company called the Bradford Guards formed in 1858, Baldwin was chosen as first lieutenant.  He later served as sergeant major, quartermaster, and assistant adjutant of the 2nd Regiment, and then quartermaster of the 1st Brigade.

Originally a Whig and later a Republican, Baldwin served in local offices including town agent, town constable, and deputy sheriff of Orange County.  In 1853, Baldwin was elected Orange County Sheriff, and he served until 1858.

In 1861, Baldwin was appointed United States Marshal for the District of Vermont, succeeding Lewis Samuel Partridge at the start of the American Civil War.  Partridge was a Democrat, and in 1862 Baldwin detained Partridge and several others for alleged Confederate sympathies, and charged them with treason. They were accused of protesting by cutting down an American flag at a recruiting office and then using pistols to prevent soldiers from raising it again.  Partridge initially traveled to Canada to escape arrest, but later appeared in Burlington to answer the charge and post bail.  In 1864 he stood trial for obstructing the draft, and was acquitted.

Following the end of the war in 1865, Baldwin was succeeded as Marshal by Hugh H. Henry.  After the death of his first wife, in 1867 Baldwin relocated to Jesup, Iowa, where he farmed and remained involved in politics as a Republican.

Baldwin died in Littleton, Iowa on October 28, 1893.  He was buried at Littleton Cemetery in Littleton.

Family
In 1835, Baldwin married Sarah Ann Woodward (1812-1867).  In 1869, Baldwin married Laura W. Kendrick of Iowa.  With his first wife, Baldwin was the father of 10 children, seven daughters and three sons.  At the time of his death, five daughters and two sons were still living and resided in Iowa.

Sarah Mehitable Baldwin Loy (1837–1899)
Adelaide Lucy Baldwin (1839–1926)
Mary Elizabeth Baldwin White (1841–1917)
Jane H. Baldwin Miller (1844–1916)
Charles Henry Baldwin (1844–1850)
Helen B. Baldwin Gates (1846–1928)
Almira Baldwin (1848–1850)
James Whitelaw Baldwin (1850–1918)
Susie Strickland Baldwin Hovey (1852–1886)
Charles Baldwin (1857–1897)

References

Sources

Internet

Newspapers

Books

External links

1812 births
1893 deaths
People from Bradford, Vermont
Vermont Whigs
Vermont Republicans
Vermont sheriffs
United States Marshals
American militia officers
People from Jesup, Iowa
Iowa Republicans
Burials in Iowa
Military personnel from Iowa